The Chinese Maritime Customs Service was a Chinese governmental tax collection agency and information service from its founding in 1854 until it split in 1949 into services operating in the Republic of China on Taiwan, and in the People's Republic of China. From its foundation in 1854 until the collapse of the Qing dynasty in 1911, the agency was known as the Imperial Maritime Customs Service.

History 
From 1757 to the signing of the Treaty of Nanking by the Chinese and British governments in 1842, all foreign trade in China operated through the Canton System, a monopoly centered in the Southern Chinese port of Canton (now Guangzhou). The treaty abolished the monopoly and opened the ports of Shanghai, Amoy (Xiamen), Ningpo (Ningbo) and Foochow (Fuzhou) to international trade, creating the need for a mechanism to collect customs duties in these additional ports.

The First Sino-Japanese War (1894-1895) and the increase of foreign concessions in China, led to the foreign powers having conflicts over nationalities' representation in the Customs Service. Britain and Russia had disputes over the number of British or Russian employees hired into the Imperial Maritime Customs Service, which historian Matzuzato connects to the Great Game.

Organization

While controlled by the Chinese central government, the Service was largely staffed at senior levels by foreigners throughout its history. It was effectively established by foreign consuls in Shanghai in 1854 to collect maritime trade taxes that were going unpaid due to the inability of Chinese officials to collect them during the Taiping Rebellion. Its responsibilities soon grew to include domestic customs administration, postal administration, harbour and waterway management, weather reporting, and anti-smuggling operations. It mapped, lit, and policed the China coast and the Yangtze. It conducted loan negotiations, currency reform, and financial and economic management. The Service published monthly Returns of Trade, a regular series of Aids to Navigation and reports on weather and medical matters. It also represented China at over twenty world fairs and exhibition, ran some educational establishments, and conducted some diplomatic activities.  Britons dominated the foreign staff of the Customs, but there were large numbers of German, U.S., French, and later Japanese staff amongst others. Promotion of Chinese nationals into senior positions started in 1929.

After two decades of operation, the system collected about one third of the revenue available to the government in Beijing. In addition, foreign trade expanded rapidly because international trade was regulated and predictable. Foreign governments benefitted because there was a mechanism to collect revenues to repay the loans that they had imposed on or granted to China. By 1900, there were 20,000 people working in forty main Customs Houses across China and many more subsidiary stations.

Inspectors-General and notable officers

The agency's first Inspector-General (IG), Horatio Nelson Lay, was dismissed in 1863 following a dispute with the Imperial court to be replaced by Sir Robert Hart, by far the most well known IG, who served until his death in 1911.  Hart oversaw the development of the Service and its activities to its fullest form. Among his many contributions were the establishment of the Tongwen Guan or School of Combined Learning, which produced numerous translations of works on international law, science, world history, and current events; the postal service; and the Northern Navy. Hart established China's central statistical office in the Maritime Service in Shanghai and the Statistical Secretariat (1873–1950) and following the Boxer Uprising, set up Customs College to provide educated Chinese staff for the Service. Hart was succeeded by Sir Francis Aglen (1869–1932) and then by his own nephew, Sir Frederick Maze (1871–1959), who served from 1929 to 1943.  In January 1950 the last foreign Inspector-General, American Lester Knox Little, resigned and the responsibilities of the Service were divided between what eventually became the Customs General Administration of the People's Republic of China, and the Republic of China Directorate General of Customs on Taiwan. It was the only bureaucratic agency of the Chinese government to operate continuously as an integrated entity from 1854 to 1950.

Amongst the many well-known figures who worked for the Customs in China were Willard Straight, botanist Augustine Henry; Johan Wilhelm Normann Munthe, Norwegian; Samuel Cornell Plant who was the First Senior River Inspector from 1915 and for whom the Plant Memorial was raised in his honour; G.R.G. Worcester (1890–1969), River Inspector from 1914 to 1948, and author of seven published books on the Yangzi River; novelist and journalists Bertram Lenox Simpson (known as Putnam Weale) and J.O.P. Bland; and historian H.B. Morse. Medical Officers attached to the Customs included John Dudgeon, in Peking, James Watson at Newchwang and Patrick Manson at Takow and Amoy. The Hong Kong Chinese businessman and political leader Robert Hotung served as a Customs clerk for two years (1878–1880).

A number of early Sinologists emerged from the Service, including linguist Thomas Francis Wade,  Edward Charles Bowra, and Charles Henry Brewitt-Taylor.

Inspectors-General, full and officiating

Life in the customs service
Even higher level 'indoor staff' could have their difficulties in the nineteenth century, as the buying power of their salaries varied with the price of silver, and the extra year's pay every seven years which Hart had negotiated for them in place of a pension did not always allow for adequate saving for retirement. Family travel costs were at the officer's expense, so not all took punctually their due of foreign leave of two years on half pay after the first seven years, and subsequently every ten years. They were subject to all the usual hazards of life in China from illness and civil disruption and difficulties in providing for the education of their children, which often involved family separations. To some extent this was compensated by the strong esprit de corps. A network of friends was sustained across changes of post by letter-writing, quite frequently the duty of their wives.

Sir Robert Hart could be a sympathetic boss, but he insisted on high standards of efficiency and honesty, and, for those aspiring to the highest rank of Commissioner, a thorough knowledge of written and spoken Chinese. His most likely young men spent a year or more in Beijing learning Chinese under his supervision, which also allowed him to evaluate other characteristics that would enable them to act sensibly and rapidly in crisis situations demanding immediate response without referral back to him.  The compensations included a short working day, which meant the later afternoon could be spent exercising and socializing, going to the races, playing tennis, taking part in amateur dramatics or musical performances, and later enjoy dinner parties, which might include 'absurd games', or a musical interlude.

Ensigns of the Customs Service

Archives 
Records of individual senior and junior staff in the Chinese Maritime Customs are preserved in the School of Oriental and African Studies, London (SOAS). Archives and Special Collections

See also 
 General Administration of Customs
 Chinese postal romanization
 Anglo-Chinese relations
 History of foreign relations of China
 Category:Ships of the Chinese Maritime Customs Service

Notes

References

Citations

Sources 

 Bickers, Robert. "Revisiting the Chinese maritime customs service, 1854–1950." Journal of Imperial and Commonwealth History 36.2 (2008): 221–226.
  Google Books 
 Chihyun Chang. (2013) Government, Imperialism and Nationalism in China: The Maritime Customs Service and Its Chinese Staff. New York: Routledge, Routledge Studies in the Modern History of Asia.   (hbk.)  (ebook).
 
 Drew, Edward B. "Sir Robert Hart and His Life Work in China." The Journal of Race Development (1913): 1–33 online.
 Eberhard-Bréard, Andrea. "Robert Hart and China's statistical revolution." Modern Asian Studies 40.3 (2006): 605–629. online
 
 Horowitz, Richard S. "Politics, power and the Chinese maritime customs: The Qing restoration and the ascent of Robert Hart." Modern Asian Studies 40.3 (2006): 549–581 online.
 
  Google Books 
 Vynckier, Henk, and Chihyun Chang, "'Imperium In Imperio': Robert Hart, the Chinese Maritime Customs Service, and its (Self-)Representations," Biography 37#1 (2014), pp. 69–92. online

External links 
 "Records of the Maritime Customs Service of China, 1854–1949" from GALE
 Bristol University Chinese Maritime Customs Project
 Bristol University China Families platform Searchable database including all CMCS staff, 1854–1949
 Handlist of L.K. Little papers at Houghton Library, Harvard University
 Maria Bugrova Bumali Project about Chinese Maritime Customs
 Modern China and the Imperial Maritime Customs project page Center for Geographic Information Science, Research Center for Humanities and Social Science, Academia Sinica

Economic history of China
Customs services
Government of the Republic of China